Late Night Tales: Nouvelle Vague is the 17th DJ mix album, released in the Late Night Tales series on Late Night Tales. It was mixed by French band, Nouvelle Vague.

Track listing
The Special AKA – "What I Like Most About You Is Your Girlfriend!" (Jerry Dammers), single from 1984
Nouvelle Vague – "Come On Eileen" (Kevin Rowland, Billy Adams, Jim Paterson)
Os Mutantes – "Baby" (Caetano Veloso) from Os Mutantes (1968)
Pale Fountains – "Unless" (Michael Head), single from 1984
Charlie Rich – "San Francisco Is a Lonely Town" (Ben Peters) from The Fabulous Charlie Rich, 1969
Tones on Tail – "Movement of Fear" (Daniel Ash, Glenn Campling) from EP Pop, 1984
Phoebe Killdeer – "Chaos" (Phoebe Killdeer), no other official release
Avril – "Urban Serenade" (Avril, Patrick Bouvet) from Members Only, 2004
Shirley Horn – "And I Love Him" (John Lennon/Paul McCartney) from Travelin' Light, 1965
Gavin Bryars – "The Vespertine Park" (Gavin Bryars), track excerpt from Hommages, 1981
David Sylvian – "A Fire in the Forest" (David Sylvian) from Blemish, 2003
Art Bears – "Civilization" (Fred Frith, Chris Cutler) from The World as It Is Today, 1981
Peggy Lee with Sy Oliver & His Orchestra – "You're My Thrill" (Jay Gorney, Sidney Clare) from Black Coffee, 1956
Glen Campbell – "By the Time I Get to Phoenix" (Jimmy Webb) from By the Time I Get to Phoenix, 1967
Isabelle Antena – "Le Poisson des Mers du Sud" (Isabelle Powaga, Sylvain Fasy), single from 1987 Hoping for Love 
Anja Garbarek – "The Last Trick" (Anja Garbarek, Gisli Kristjansson), single from 2005 Briefly Shaking
Les Petroleuses (featuring Camille) – "Nicole" (Alex Pavlou, Marc Collin) from Les Petroleuses, 2002
Cibelle – "Phoenix" (Cibelle) from The Shine of Dried Electric Leaves, 2006
This Mortal Coil – "You and Your Sister" (Chris Bell) from Blood, 1991
Julie London – "Lonely Girl" (Bobby Troup) from Lonely Girl, 1956
David Shrigley – "What I Ate" (David Shrigley), first release

References

Nouvelle Vague
Covers albums
2007 compilation albums